Gen. John Thompson House is a historic home located at College Township, Centre County, Pennsylvania.  It was built in 1813–1814, and is a two-story, three-bay, Georgian style limestone and sandstone farmhouse with stone kitchen ell. The interior has a traditional center hall plan.  A large one-story board-and-batten sided family room addition was built in 1958–1959.  Also on the property is a large barn dated to the American Civil War period.

It was added to the National Register of Historic Places in 1978.

References

Houses on the National Register of Historic Places in Pennsylvania
Georgian architecture in Pennsylvania
Houses completed in 1813
Houses in Centre County, Pennsylvania
National Register of Historic Places in Centre County, Pennsylvania